The Sopinka Cup is an annual trial advocacy competition in Canada organized by The Advocates' Society and sponsored by the American College of Trial Lawyers.  This two-day event is aimed to encourage law schools to train students in the art of oral advocacy.  Elimination occurs in four regional competitions across Canada, leaving eight law schools to represent various geographical areas of Canada and compete in the bilingual National Finals hosted in Ottawa.  Universities in the western provinces (British Columbia, Alberta, Saskatchewan and Manitoba) compete in the MacIntyre Cup.  Universities in Ontario compete in the Arnup Cup. Both are mock trial advocacy competitions. Universities in Quebec compete in the Guy Guérin Cup.  Universities in the eastern provinces (New Brunswick and Nova Scotia) compete in the McKelvey Cup.

The Sopinka Cup was established in 1999 to honour the late Supreme Court of Canada Justice John Sopinka, who was a long time Fellow of the American College of Trial Lawyers.

Past winners
2021: Jade Barrière and Ingrid Mavoli from University of Ottawa Faculty of Law (Civil law team)
2019: Nathan Wells and Olivia Whynot from University of British Columbia Faculty of Law
2018: Kelsey Angeley and Dominique Verdurmen from McGill University
2017: Anita Yuk, Zachary Carter, Brady Knight and Sarah Loewen from University of Saskatchewan College of Law (Best Overall Advocate: Lisa Delaney, Dalhousie University)
2016: Jonathon Austin and Fraser Genuis from University of Alberta (Best Overall Advocate: Caroline Humphrey, Université de Moncton)
2015: Fraser Dickson and Dov Whitman from McGill University (Best Overall Advocate: Noémie Doiron, Université de Moncton)
2014: Reem Zaia and Sarah Sullivan from University of Ottawa Faculty of Law (Best Overall Advocate: Reem Zaia, University of Ottawa)
2013: Suzanne Kittell and Michele Charles from Dalhousie University (Best Overall Advocate: Marie-Pier Emery-Rochette)
2012: Jared Epp and Lauren Ignacz from University of Saskatchewan College of Law (Best Overall Advocate: Zoë Marszewski Paliare, Queen’s University)
2011: Jason Demers, Evan Thompson, Kayla DeMars-Krentz and Andrew Kuzma from University of Saskatchewan College of Law (Best Overall Advocate: Evan Thompson, University of Saskatchewan College of Law)
2010: Renée Blanchard and Richard Deveau from L'Université de Moncton (Best Overall Advocate: Ryan LePage, University of Saskatchewan College of Law)
2009: Laura McPheeters and George Roper from University of British Columbia Faculty of Law
2008: Monika Rahman and Mareike Newhouse from McGill University Faculty of Law
2007: Karin McCaig and Donna Polgar from Osgoode Hall Law School
2006: Eric Hachinski and Lana Jackson from University of Manitoba
2005: Laura Marr and Krista Smith from Dalhousie University
2004: Anne-Marie Lacoste and Marie-Pier Michon from Université de Montréal
2003: Kevin Toyne and Jennifer Malabar from University of Manitoba
2002: Almira Esmail and Tim Livingston from University of Victoria School of Law  (Best Cross-examination, Best Closing address to the Jury, and Best Advocate: Almira Esmail, University of Victoria)
2001: Stephen Christie and Paul Grower from University of Manitoba
2000: Eli Lederman and Christine Doucet from Dalhousie University
1999: Katherine Hilton and David Armstrong from University of Toronto

MacIntyre Cup
The regional round for law schools in the western provinces is called the MacIntyre Cup.

Past winners
2018: Yassir Al-Naji and Ben Johnson from University of Manitoba
2017: Agapi Mavridis and Adriel Agpalza from University of Manitoba
2016: Kevin Murray and Andrew Eyer from Peter A. Allard School of Law, The University of British Columbia
2015: Zachary T. Courtemanche and Anthony Foderaro from University of Manitoba
2014:  Cadeyrn Christie, Kaitlyn Chewka, and Tyler Gloux from University of Victoria Co-winners with Sean Fagan, Nathanial Day, Grace Waschuk, and Rylund Hunter from University of Saskatchewan. This was the first time in the history of the McIntyre Cup that two teams reached an exact tie based on points.
2013:  Stephanie Frazer, Alexandra Fox, Curtis Mennie and Katherine Pintye from University of Saskatchewan 
2012:  Anna Kontsedalova and Molly Shamess from University of British Columbia
2011: Jason Demers, Evan Thompson, Kayla DeMars-Krentz and Andrew Kuzma from the University of Saskatchewan
2010: Yun Li and Melania Cannon from University of British Columbia
 2009: University of Saskatchewan
2008: Ashley Syer and Thomas Moran from the University of British Columbia
2002: Almira Esmail and Timothy Livingston from University of Victoria
1999: University of Saskatchewan
1995: University of Saskatchewan

Arnup Cup
The regional round for law schools in Ontario is called the Arnup Cup, named after Justice John Arnup.  It is held in Toronto, run by The Advocates' Society and sponsored by WeirFolds LLP.

Past winners
2022: Shannon Blaine and Alannah Safnuk from University of Toronto
2021: Akkila Thirukesan and Alexis Mawko from University of Ottawa
2020: Justis Danto-Clancy and Justin Blanco from Bora Laskin Faculty of Law
2019: Amanda Gallo and Nathan Wainwright from Bora Laskin Faculty of Law
2016: Samuel Greene and Malini Vijaykumar from University of Toronto
2014: Bryan Guertin and Benjamin Snow from Queen's University
2013: Ryann Atkins and Anna Cooper from University of Toronto
2012: Robert Thomson and Zoe Marszewski Paliare from Queen's University
2011: Dorothy Charach and Eric Pellegrino from Osgoode Hall Law School
2010: Mark Rieger and Joseph Heller from University of Toronto
2009: Amanda Mclachlan and Lauren Wilhelm from University of Windsor
2004: Meghan Ferguson and Ewan Lyttle from University of Ottawa
2002: Anna Marrison and Adriana Ametrano from University of Toronto

Guy Guérin Cup
The regional round for law schools in Quebec is called the Guy Guérin Cup, named after Judge Guy Guérin (1927-1994), who was Justice (1968-1994) and then Chief Justice (1985-1988) of the Court of the Sessions of the Peace, which became the Court of Quebec, Criminal and Penal Division in 1988.  The University of Ottawa has competed in this competition on occasion.

Past winners
2022: François Bélanger and Nicolas Besner, University of Ottawa Common Law
2021: Jade Barrière and Ingrid Magoli, University of Ottawa Civil Law
2020: Nadir Khan and Rebecca Schur, McGill University
2019: Audréanne Côté and Moses Otim, McGill University
2018: Kelsey Angeley and Dominique Verdurmen, McGill University
2016: Marie-Louise Chabot and Suzanne Zaccour,  McGill University
2015: Andrée-Anne Lavoie and Sandrine Bourgon, University of Ottawa Civil Law
2014: Evelyn Gauvin and Christine Côté, University of Ottawa Civil Law
2013: Carmen Barbu and Carle Jane Evans, McGill University
2012: Marie-Ève Lavoie and Alexander Steinhouse, McGill University
2011: Katrina Peddle and Anya Kortenaar, McGill University
2010: Nicholas Melling and Jeannine Plamondon, McGill University
2009: Andrew Carvajal and Alexandre Bien-Aimé, McGill University
2006: Andrew Bratt and Derek Ishak, University of Ottawa

McKelvey Cup
The regional round for law schools in the eastern provinces is called the McKelvey Cup, named after Neil McKelvey, Q.C.

Past winners
2021: Elizabeth Matheson and Anthony Buckland from Dalhousie University
2020: Marie-Eve Nowlan and Catherine Poirier from Université de Moncton
2018: Nicole Briand and Alexandre Vienneau from Université de Moncton
2017: Ian Wilenius and Lisa Delaney from Dalhousie University
2016: Ria Guidone and Mary Brown from Dalhousie University
2015: Noémie Doiron and Élaine Lang from Université de Moncton
2014: Alexis Couture and Alexandre Gibson from Université de Moncton
2013: Suzanne Kittell and Michele Charles from Dalhousie University
2012: Ludmilla Jarda et Clémence Talbot from Université de Moncton
2011: Sophie Rioux and Thomas Raffy from Université de Moncton
2010: Renée Blanchard and Richard Deveau from Université de Moncton
2009: Francine Ouellette and Jonathan Saumier from Université de Moncton
2008: Mat Brechtel and Conor Dooley from Dalhousie University
2007: Brian Gallant and Luc Roy from Université de Moncton
2006: Tammy Lamarche and Junie Saint-Fleur from Université de Moncton
2005: Nadia Bérubé Mélanie Trembley from Université de Moncton
2004: Eric Charland and Carley Parish from Université de Moncton
2003: Marc Bourgeois and Luc Desroches from Université de Moncton
2002: Jennifer Grey and Grant McKenzie from University of New Brunswick
2001: Lisa Taylor and Jonathoin Feasby from Dalhousie University
2000: Christine Doucet and Eli Lederman from Dalhousie University
1999: Charlotte Kanya-Forstner and Kim Von Arx from University of New Brunswick

References

External links 
 Complete list of winners

Legal organizations based in the United States